Toni Moore is a trade unionist and politician from Barbados.  Moore has served as general secretary of the Barbados Workers' Union since 2014.  She was appointed an independent senator in 2018 and resigned from the post in October 2020 to contest the 2020 St George North by-election for the Barbados Labour Party. Moore won the 11 November 2020 byelection with 66.7 percent of the vote, on a 49.8 percent turnout of the constituency's 9,897 registered voters.

References

Living people
Members of the House of Assembly of Barbados
Members of the Senate of Barbados
20th-century Barbadian women politicians
20th-century Barbadian politicians
21st-century Barbadian women politicians
21st-century Barbadian politicians
Year of birth missing (living people)
Barbados Labour Party politicians